Perochaeta is a genus of flies in the family Sepsidae.

Species
Perochaeta cuirassa Ang, 2010
Perochaeta dikowi Ang, 2008
Perochaeta exilis Iwasa, 2012
Perochaeta hennigi Ozerov, 1992
Perochaeta lobo Ang, 2010
Perochaeta orientalis (Meijere, 1913)

References

Sepsidae
Diptera of Asia
Brachycera genera
Taxa named by Oswald Duda